Nokianvirta is a river of Finland. It flows from the lake Pyhäjärvi near Tampere to the lake Kulovesi, which is a part of a lake system from which the Kokemäki River begins its course towards the Gulf of Bothnia. Nokianvirta flows through Nokia, Finland, the town that gave its name to the Nokia Corporation.

See also
List of rivers of Finland

References

External links
 Blog about Nokia, with name Nokianvirta:Nokianvirta

Rivers of Finland
Kokemäenjoki basin